Mohammed Kamal el-Shennawi (December 26, 1921 – August 22, 2011) was an Egyptian film and television actor, director and producer.

Filmography

References

External links 
 

1921 births
2011 deaths
Egyptian male film actors
Egyptian film producers
Egyptian male television actors
Egyptian film directors
Egyptian expatriates in Sudan